Hon. Mark George Kerr Rolle (1835–1907;  Mark George Kerr Trefusis), of Stevenstone, St Giles in the Wood, Devon, was High Sheriff of Devon in 1864, a DL of Devon and High Steward of Barnstaple. 

Due to an  inheritance from his uncle by marriage, John Rolle, 1st Baron Rolle (1750–1842), he became the largest private landowner in Devon, and according to the Return of Owners of Land, 1873 his landholdings, of which he was life-tenant under his uncle's will, extended to 55,000 acres. He was a prolific philanthropist and builder and restorer of churches, farmhouses and cottages, the latter for his estate workers.

Origins

The Honorable Mark George Kerr Trefusis was born on 13 November 1835 at Heanton Satchville in the parish of Huish, Devon, the 2nd son of Charles Rodolph Trefusis, 19th Baron Clinton (1791–1866) by his wife Lady Elizabeth Georgiana Kerr (died 1871), a daughter of William Kerr, 6th Marquess of Lothian.  His eldest brother, Charles Henry Rolle Hepburn-Stuart-Forbes-Trefusis later the 20th Baron Clinton, received a large paternal inheritance in land of his own (albeit impoverished by mortgages and annuities to dependent relatives).

Inheritance
At the age of 6 (in 1842), Mark Trefusis inherited the vast estates of his 92-year-old uncle by marriage,  John Rolle, 1st Baron Rolle (1756–1842) of Stevenstone and Bicton. Rolle had married as his 2nd wife Louisa Trefusis (1794–1885), Mark Trefusis's aunt. Rolle died childless and by his will made his wife's nephew, Mark Trefusis, his heir, as a life tenant  in tail-male. As required by Lord Rolle's will on 30 January 1852 Mark  Trefusis assumed the arms and name of Rolle by royal licence. He had attended Eton College two years earlier.

Career
He was made Captain of the North Devon Yeomanry. In 1861, he was Barnstaple's High Steward. In 1864, he was made Sheriff of Devon.

Marriage and issue

On 6 October 1860 in St Johns, Edinburgh, Rolle married Lady Gertrude Jane Douglas (1838–1924) a daughter of George Sholto Douglas, 17th Earl of Morton (died 1858). Rolle produced no sons, thus the entail male under Lord Rolle's will precluded his daughters from the Rolle inheritance. His two daughters were:
 Gertrude Emily Rolle, who married Brig.-Gen.  Sir Hugh Henry John Drummond, 1st Baronet (1859–1924) of Lasswade,  a younger son of Sir James Williams-Drummond, 3rd Baronet, of Hawthornden. She had one daughter.
 Mary Frances Rolle (died 1945), who  married on 7 June 1894 Major Arthur Scott Brown (born 1866) of Buckland Filleigh, North Devon. She had 2 daughters.

Succession
His heir under the tail-male of Lord Rolle's will was his nephew Charles John Robert Hepburn-Stuart-Forbes-Trefusis, 21st Baron Clinton (1863–1957), who sold many of the estates to meet inheritance taxes.

Manors held
Mark Rolle inherited the following manors and properties, amongst many others:
 East Budleigh, near Bicton, inherited by Denys Rolle (1614–1638) from his mother Anne Denys, it having been granted by King Henry VIII to her great-grandfather Sir Thomas Denys (c. 1477 – 1561), of Holcombe Burnell
 Exmouth, near Bicton, where Mark Rolle was the principal landowner. Inherited by Denys Rolle (1614–1638) from his mother Anne Denys, it having been granted by King Henry VIII to her great-grandfather Sir Thomas Denys (c. 1477 – 1561), of Holcombe Burnell
 Otterton purchased in 1786 by Denys Rolle (1725–1797) from the heirs of the Duke family.
 Buckland Brewer purchased in 1544 by the patriarch George Rolle (c. 1486 – 1552) following the dissolution of Dunkeswell Abbey.
 Great Torrington (lordship of manor of) purchased by Denys Rolle (1614–1638) from Sir William Fortescue.
 Woodbury, former estate of the Prideaux family, acquired in 1650 by Sir John Rolle (died 1706) from Sir Thomas Clifford.
 Colaton Raleigh acquired in 1650 by Sir John Rolle (died 1706) from Sir Thomas Clifford.

Building development

Churches and almshouses 
The following churches were either built, rebuilt or restored at the expense of Mark Rolle:
 Church of St Giles, St Giles in the Wood, rebuilt 1862–3, 
 Church of St John the Evangelist, Warkleigh
 Church of St Michael, Beer. 1876–7 to designs of Hayward & Son.
 Church of St Peter, Budleigh Salterton, 1891–3, to the design of G. Fellowes-Prynne. This was the successor to the Chapel of the Holy Trinity, at the crossroads of Chapel Hill and East Terrace, built by Lord Rolle in 1812 as a chapel of ease to the parish church of his manor of East Budleigh. He referred to it in his will as "my chapel at Budleigh Salterton" and bequeathed the advowson to his wife, assuming she should continue to reside at Bicton. Following the expansion of the town as a sea-side resort, the chapel was too small for its purpose and Mark Rolle donated land at "The Lawn" for the site of a new church dedicated to St Peter, which he built at a cost of £10,000.  
 Holy Trinity Church, Exmouth. The chancel was added by Lady Rolle in 1856 and Mark Rolle commissioned a total re-modelling (1905-7) by G. H. Fellowes-Prynne

Estate cottages 
The Rolle estate terraced cottages in East Devon may be compared as a phenomenon of Victorian philanthropy to the cottages built in the west of the county by the Dukes of Bedford around their Tavistock estate.
 Beer, Common Lane, 1873. Flint-faced and brick-trimmed each with a spiked gable and porch. Deemed "especially appealing" by Pevsner.
 St Giles in the Wood, 
 Woodbury, near East Budleigh, Rolle Estate housing of 1877.
 East Budleigh, Rolle Estate buildings, for example Sawmill Cottage (1876)
 Otterton, Rolle Estate cottages 1870s, and farm-houses, such as Lower Pinn (1851).

Stevenstone House 

Mark Rolle's most ambitious building project was his complete rebuild of Stevenstone House, in the parish of St Giles in the Wood, the most ancient seat of the Rolle family in Devon, where they became established in the 16th century. He demolished the former house on the site in 1868 and built in its place between 1869 and 1873, to the plans of Charles Barry Jr., a huge mansion in the "Franco-Italian style".

Other 
At Exmouth, where Mark Rolle was the chief landowner, he effected radical changes, in the opinion of Pevsner "of little architectural consequence". This appeared to be more of a commercial venture. This is situated around Rolle Street running into Rolle Road, named after him. He sold the Rolle Canal at Great Torrington, built by Baron Rolle 1822-4, to the railway company in 1871.

Donations
At Woodbury, near East Budleigh, in 1870 he gave the site for the new school. In 1860 he built the "National School" in St Giles in the Wood, with space for 220 children, and erected a reading room in the village. He instituted a new curacy in Chittlehampton and paid the stipend, in which parish he also donated in 1902 a garden for the extension of the churchyard.

Death and burial

Mark Rolle died on 27 April 1907 at Argelès-sur-Mer in the South of France, and was buried not in a churchyard within a former Rolle manor, but in the Church of St James the Less in Huish, the manor and chief seat of the Trefusis family, Barons Clinton, of Heanton Satchville, Huish. He died without male issue, his heir to the Rolle estates, which were in tail-male, being his nephew Charles John Robert Hepburn-Stuart-Forbes-Trefusis, 21st Baron Clinton (1863–1957).  Heavy death duties were payable by his heir, which resulted in the sale of Stevenstone, which was shortly thereafter demolished. Other parts of the North Devon Rolle estates were also sold, the family having decided to concentrate its holdings in East Devon around the historic core of Bicton.  Monuments in his memory exist in Holy Trinity Church, Rolle Road, Exmouth and in the Church of St Giles, St Giles in the Wood.  He is also commemorated by a large stone cross in the churchyard of St Michael and All Angels, Great Torrington.

Monuments

Beer Church

A memorial tablet exists in Beer Church, which he himself rebuilt, affixed to a north-west pier, with an inscription echoing that of Sir Christopher Wren in St Paul's Cathedral, built by him: 
"To the glory of God and in memory of the Hon.ble Mark G.K. Rolle (son of the 19th Baron Clinton) lord of the manor of Beer and a generous benefactor to this church and village. The tower clock was erected by subscription of parishioners and friends. This church (built A.D. 1877) on an ancient foundation was one of his many gifts to the parish of Beer. He died on the 27th April 1907. Si requiris monumentum circumspice. In memory also of the Lady Gertrude Rolle his wife (daughter of the 19th Earl of Morton) who died on the 21st March 1924".
The armorials show Rolle with an inescutcheon of pretence of Walter of Sarsden, indicating the marriage of John Rolle (1679–1730), MP, of Stevenstone, grandfather of Lord Rolle, to the heiress of that family, Isabella Walter. These arms are also visible impaled by Rolle on the Georgian "Library Room" still surviving at Stevenstone.

Great Torrington

A Memorial Cross to Mark Rolle exists in the churchyard by the west door of St Michael's Church, Great Torrington, with the following inscription: "To the glory of God and in memory of the Honourable Mark George Kerr Rolle of Stevenstone, born 13th November 1835 died 27th April 1907 this cross was erected in grateful recognition of his life and character, his generosity and sterling worth, by the inhabitants of Great Torrington and neighbourhood in 1909 during the mayoralty of Milton Chapple"
In 1870 he also gave to the town of Great Torrington the fountain and clock in the square.

St Giles-in-the-Wood

In addition to the mural monument within the church erected by his family, a memorial cross was erected 
at the east side of the churchyard of St Giles's Church, St Giles-in-the-Wood, directly in front of the lych-gate, with the following inscription: "Erected by the parishioners in loving memory of the Honourable Mark George Kerr Rolle the friend and benefactor of this parish. April 27th 1907"

Notes

References

Sources

Further reading

Baily's Monthly Magazine of Sports and Pastimes, and Racing Register, Vol.19, 1870, biography 
 Coates, R. Records of the Rolle Estates.

 
 Rolle Archives, 150 volumes of correspondence written by a succession of Rolle Estate Managers in the 19th century, library, Clinton Estates Devon, East Devon headquarters at Rolle Estate, Bicton.

High Sheriffs of Devon
Mark
Younger sons of barons
1835 births
1907 deaths